Reddypalli is a village in the Ranga Reddy district, Telangana, India. It is divided into 18 habitations.

References 

Villages in Anantapur district